Knud Erik Engedal (born 18 March 1942) is a Danish former footballer who played as a goalkeeper. He made 17 appearances for the Denmark national team from 1968 to 1969.

References

External links
 
 
 

1942 births
Living people
Danish men's footballers
Association football goalkeepers
Denmark international footballers
Denmark youth international footballers
Denmark under-21 international footballers
Division 2 (Swedish football) players
Boldklubben 1913 players
Västerås SK Fotboll players
Kolding IF players
Danish expatriate men's footballers
Danish expatriate sportspeople in Sweden
Expatriate footballers in Sweden
People from Sønderborg
Sportspeople from the Region of Southern Denmark